William Johnstone may refer to:

Arts
 William Johnstone (actor)  (1908–1996), American actor
 William Johnstone (artist) (1897–1981), Scottish artist
 William W. Johnstone (1938–2004), American author
 Will B. Johnstone (1881–1943), American writer
 William Borthwick Johnstone (1804–1868), Scottish painter, art collector, and gallery curator

Politics
 William A. Johnstone (1869–1937), member of the California legislature
 William Johnstone, 1st Marquess of Annandale (1664–1721), Scottish nobleman
 Sir William Johnstone, 2nd Baronet (died 1727), Member of Parliament for Dumfries Burghs and Dumfriesshire
 Sir William Pulteney, 5th Baronet (1729–1805), born William Johnstone, Scottish Member of Parliament

Sports
 Bill Johnstone (footballer, born 1900) (1900–1979), Australian rules footballer for North Melbourne
 Bill Johnstone (footballer, born 1919) (1919–1976), Australian rules footballer for Collingwood
 Bill Johnstone (Scottish footballer) (fl. 1920s), Scottish footballer (Clyde, Reading, Arsenal, Oldham Athletic)
 Billy Johnstone (born 1959), Australian rugby league player
 William Johnstone (footballer) (1864–1950), Scottish footballer (Third Lanark, Scotland)
 William Raphael Johnstone (1905–1964), Australian jockey

Other
 William Johnstone (VC) (1823–1857), Victoria Cross recipient

See also
William Johnston (disambiguation)
William Johnson (disambiguation)
Bill Johnston (disambiguation)